Maklakiewicz is a Polish-language surname derived from the Russian  word maklak (маклак), petty broker. It may refer to:

Jan Maklakiewicz (1899-1954), Polish composer
Tadeusz Wojciech Maklakiewicz (1922−1996), Polish composer
Zdzisław Maklakiewicz (1927-1977), Polish actor

See also
Maklakov

Polish-language surnames
Occupational surnames